Stanley Isaacs (April 22, 1929 – April 3, 2013) was an American sportswriter and columnist most known for his work with Newsday. He was also one of the first columnists to write about televised sports.

Early life
Isaacs was born in Williamsburg, Brooklyn, on April 22, 1929. He attended Eastern District High School and then Brooklyn College before working for the Daily Compass. He moved to Newsday in 1954.

Time with Newsday
Isaacs's column was called Out of Left Field. He covered multiple historic sporting events, including Bobby Thomson's Shot Heard 'Round the World, Roger Maris's chase of Babe Ruth's single-season home run record, bouts between Muhammad Ali and Joe Frazier and the New York Islanders multiple Stanley Cup victories in the late 1970s and early 1980s. He also pushed and promoted the idea of having a statue of Pee Wee Reese and Jackie Robinson constructed. It now stands outside MCU Park, home of the Brooklyn Cyclones.

When he began his televised sports column in 1978, only one other major newspaper had one - the Boston Globe.

He wrote his final Newsday column in 1992.

Later life and death
Isaacs died on April 3, 2013 in Haverford, Pennsylvania.

References

See also
Philly.com article

1929 births
2013 deaths
American columnists
Brooklyn College alumni
People from Williamsburg, Brooklyn
Writers from Brooklyn
Sportswriters from New York (state)
Eastern District High School alumni